In Greek mythology, Phaedra  (or Fedra) was a Cretan princess. Her name derives from the Greek word , which means "bright".  According to legend, she was the daughter of Minos and Pasiphaë, and the wife of Theseus. Phaedra fell in love with her stepson Hippolytus.  After he rejected her advances, she accused him of trying to rape her, causing Theseus to pray to Poseidon to kill him, and then killed herself.

The story of Phaedra is told in Euripides' play Hippolytus, Seneca the Younger's Phaedra, and Ovid's Heroides.  It has inspired many modern works of art and literature, including a play by Jean Racine.

Family 
Phaedra was the daughter of Minos and Pasiphaë of Crete, and thus sister to Acacallis, Ariadne, Androgeus, Deucalion, Xenodice, Glaucus and Catreus and half-sister to the Minotaur. She was the wife of Theseus and the mother of Demophon of Athens and Acamas.

Mythology 

Much of what we know about the mythology and story of Phaedra is from a collection of plays and poems. Many of these earlier sources such as Phaedra, a play by Sophocles, and Hippolytus Veiled, a play by Euripides, have been lost. However, works such as Phaedra, written by Roman statesman and philosopher Seneca the Younger, and the Heroides, a collection of poems written by Ovid, give details of the story. As a result there are many different versions of the story of Phaedra and Hippolytus, but they all share the same general structure, with two versions becoming more prominent over time. Version 1 depicts Phaedra as the shameless and lustful wife of Theseus, the King of Athens. The other version, Version 2, shows Phaedra in a much kinder light, as a noble and virtuous queen, yet each has a similarly tragic ending.

Traditional version 

In the more traditional version of the story, Phaedra is the primary cause of misfortune in the tale. The story goes that Phaedra, who was the mother of two sons, Acamas and Demophon, falls in love with her stepson Hippolytus, Theseus's son by another woman (born to either Hippolyta, queen of the Amazons, or Antiope, her sister)  and sets out to entice him. It is unclear in this version exactly why Hippolytus rejects Phaedra, if not simply because he is her stepson, but Phaedra becomes humiliated when Hippolytus refuses her. 

Afraid of the consequences that may befall her if Theseus learns about her actions, she lies to her husband that Hippolytus tried to rape her. This angers Theseus who immediately curses his son with one of three wishes granted to him by Poseidon, the god of the sea. At the request of Theseus to kill Hippolytus, the god summons a huge bull that rises from the sea and scares Hippolytus's horses into a frenzy that dragged the rider to his death. In one rendition of the story Hippolytus's name is translated to "the one who is torn apart by horses".

In the end Phaedra's treachery is somehow discovered (it is unclear how), and to avoid a more painful death, she decides to take her own life.

Alternative version 
In this version of the story, Phaedra has a reputation of a virtuous queen and is not entirely responsible for her actions. She gets caught in the crossfire between Hippolytus and Aphrodite the goddess of love. This narrative requires a little background on an earlier conflict between Hippolytus and Aphrodite. Hippolytus is a devout follower of Artemis the goddess of the hunt and, among other things, the goddess of chastity. As a result he hails her as the greatest of all deities and in a show of devotion to honor the goddess, Hippolytus vows eternal chastity, swearing that he will never love or marry. This offends Aphrodite who is regularly worshipped by all in Greek mythology, and in an attempt to punish Hippolytus, the goddess of love curses his stepmother Phaedra to fall madly in love with him.

Phaedra becomes distraught and depressed for several months due to "dreadful longings" for Hippolytus. Eventually, unable to tolerate the burden of her suffering in silence, she confides in her nurse and shares her feelings towards Hippolytus. The nurse who is concerned about the health of her mistress tells Hippolytus about how Phaedra feels. Bound by his oath of abstinence Hippolytus rejects his stepmother. When Phaedra learns of her nurse's actions, she fears the consequences of her immoral desires and plans to commit suicide. But before doing so, she writes a letter to her husband Theseus accusing Hippolytus of attempting to seduce her in an attempt to clear her name and possibly protect her children from misfortune.

Similar to the ending of Version 1, once Theseus reads Phaedra's letter and learns of his son's supposed sins, he prays to Poseidon to kill his son. And in a very similar fashion to the first tale, Poseidon summons a huge bull to scare Hippolytus's horses into a wild frenzy that kills him. However in this version of the narrative, the story does not end there. Artemis is saddened by the loss of her devout follower and reveals the truth to Theseus about Aphrodite and the curse she placed on his wife. The story ends with Theseus grieving over the death of his wife and son.

Other versions of the story 
In another version, after Phaedra told Theseus that Hippolytus had raped her, Theseus killed his son, and Phaedra then committed suicide out of guilt, for she had not intended Hippolytus to die. Artemis later told Theseus the truth. 

In a third version, Phaedra told Theseus and did not kill herself; Dionysus then sent a wild bull which terrified Hippolytus's horses.

Euripides twice placed this story on the Athenian stage, of which one version survives. 

According to some sources, Hippolytus had spurned Aphrodite to remain a steadfast and virginal devotee of Artemis, and Aphrodite made Phaedra fall in love with him as a punishment. The Athenians maintained a small shrine high on the south slope of the Acropolis devoted to Aphrodite 'for Hippolytus'.

In one version, Phaedra's nurse told Hippolytus of her love, and he swore he would not reveal her as a source of information.

Cultural influence 
Phaedra has been the subject of many notable works in art, literature, music and film.

In art

 Phaedra with attendant, probably her nurse, a fresco from Pompeii circa 60–20 BC
 Figure 8 Phaedra, wall painting, early first century CE, Pompeii, now Antiquarium di Pompeii, Pompeii, inv. no. 20620,
 Second century Roman Sarcophagus of Beatrice of Lorraine in the Camposanto in Pisa. This was the model for Nicola Pisano's work on the Pisa Baptistery in the mid-thirteenth century.
Alexandre Cabanel's Phaedra (1880)
Ewen Feuillâtre's Phaedra (2020)

In literature
Phaedra's story appears in many acclaimed works of literature, including:
 Euripides, Hippolytus, Greek play
 Ovid, Heroides IV
 Seneca the Younger, Phaedra, Latin play
 Jean Racine, Phèdre (1677), French play
 Algernon Charles Swinburne, Phaedra (1866), English lyrical drama
 Herman Bang, Fædra (1883), Danish novel.
 Gabriele D'Annunzio, Fedra (1909), Italian play
 Miguel de Unamuno, Fedra (1911), Spanish play
 Eugene O'Neill, Desire Under the Elms (1924), American play
 Marina Tsvetaeva, Fedra (1928), Russian play
 Robinson Jeffers, Cawdor (1928), English long poem
 Marguerite Yourcenar, "Phaedra", short story from Fires (1957) 
 Mary Renault, The Bull from the Sea (1962), English novel
 Frank D. Gilroy, That Summer, That Fall (1967), retelling of Phaedra and Hippolytus
 Tony Harrison, Phaedra Britannica (1975), English verse play
 Salvador Espriu, Fedra (1978), Catalan play
 Per Olov Enquist, Till Fedra (1980), Swedish play
 Didier-Georges Gabily, Gibiers du temps (1994-1995), French contemporary play
 Sarah Kane, Phaedra's Love (1996), Gate Theatre London
 Charles L. Mee, True Love (2001), modernized adaptation of Euripides's Hippolytus and Racine's Phèdre
 Frank McGuinness, Phaedra (Donmar Warehouse, 2006)
 Ted Hughes, Phedre FSG, c1998, Drama/Classics, 
 Jennifer Saint, Ariadne (2021), Flatiron Books
 Laura Shepperson, Phaedra (2023), Alcove Press

In music 
Phaedra is also the subject of a number of musical works, including:
 Hippolyte et Aricie, opera (tragédie en musique) by Jean-Philippe Rameau, 1733
 Phédre, opera by Jean-Baptiste Lemoyne, 1786
 Fedra, opera by Giovanni Paisiello, 1788
 Fedra, opera by Simon Mayr, 1820
 Phèdre, overture by Jules Massenet, 1873 
 Fedra, opera by Ildebrando Pizzetti, 1915, based on D'Annunzio's 1909 play
 Character in L'abandon d'Ariane by Darius Milhaud, 1928
 "Some Velvet Morning", Nancy Sinatra and Lee Hazlewood, 1967
 "Phaedra" (rock band in Colorado) led by Brett Tuggle 1969
 Phaedra (monodrama for mezzo-soprano and orchestra) by George Rochberg, 1973–1974
 Phaedra, album by Tangerine Dream, 1974
 Phaedra, song cycle by Mikis Theodorakis
 Phaedra, cantata by Benjamin Britten, 1976
 Lament for Phaedra, composition for soprano and cello by John Tavener, 1995
 "Phaedra's Meadow", song on the Blue Rodeo album Are You Ready, 2005
 Phaedra, opera by Hans Werner Henze, 2007
 Phaedra, song from Obsidian, the 2013 third studio album of electronic artist Baths.
 I Remember Phaedra, song from Creatures of the Deep by Rob Haigh, 2017
 Death Grips Is Online song from Year of the Snitch by Death Grips, 2018
 Phaedra, song from From Home by The Rubinoos, 2019
 Phaedra, song from How Do You Live by Amon Tobin, 2021

In film

 Fedra (1909), silent short film directed by Oreste Gherardini with Italia Vitaliani as Fedra, and Carlo Duse and Ciro Galvani
 Fedra (1956), filmed in Spain, based on Seneca's Latin play. Directed by Manuel Mur Oti with Emma Penella , Enrique Diosdado , and Vicente Parra in the main roles.
 Minotaur, the Wild Beast of Crete, 1960 Italian sword-and-sandal fantasy film, with Rosanna Schiaffino as Phaedra and her sister Ariadne
 Phaedra (1962), based on Euripides's play, directed by Jules Dassin with Melina Mercouri and Anthony Perkins
Ballad of a Bounty Hunter, (1968), a Spaghetti Western adaptation also released as Fedra West directed by Joaquín Luis Romero Marchent.
 , based on Racine's play, directed by Pierre Jourdan with Marie Bell and Claude Giraud, music by François Couperin
 Luciana Paluzzi, portrayed Phaedra in War Goddess (1973)
 Freida Pinto portrayed Phaedra in Immortals (2011), loosely based on the Greek myths of Theseus and the Minotaur and the Titanomachy.
 Queen of Hearts (2019) Denmark

Notes

References 

 Smith, William; Dictionary of Greek and Roman Biography and Mythology, London (1873). "Phaedra"
 Virgil, Aeneid VI.445; Ovid, Metamorphoses XV.497

External links

Princesses in Greek mythology
Queens in Greek mythology
Characters in Book VI of the Aeneid
Cretan characters in Greek mythology
Attican characters in Greek mythology
 
Theseus
Suicides in Greek mythology
Deeds of Aphrodite